Nicolas Ghosn (1940 – 1 November 2018) was a Lebanese politician and lawyer.

Biography
Ghosn first ran in the Lebanese Parlaiment elections in 1992, which he lost. However, he won in 1996 and his term lasted until 2000. He lost his seat in the 2000 elections but regained it in 2005. Ghosn decided to not run again in 2009, thus ending his political career. In his final term, he ran under the Future Movement, which helped him gain support of the Greek Orthodox Church and set up the March 14 Alliance.

References

1940 births
Date of birth missing
People from Koura District
2018 deaths
Place of death missing
Lebanese lawyers
Lebanese politicians
Greek Orthodox Christians from Lebanon

Future Movement politicians